Delwinder Singh s/o Ranjit Singh (born 5 August 1992) is a Singaporean professional footballer who plays as a defender for Singapore Premier League side Balestier Khalsa. He made his international debut for Singapore in a friendly match against the Philippines on 7 October 2011.

Club career

Early career 
Delwinder started his career with Tanjong Pagar United in the 2011 S.League season. Despite still being a teenager, he was handed the captaincy of the Jaguars. After leaving the Jaguars, he played for Geylang as well as the Young Lions.

Hougang United 
Delwinder was left without a club after he was released by the Young Lions as his NS obligations meant that his unpredictable schedule made it hard for him to attend training regularly. He was given a lifeline when the LionsXII allowed him to train with them to keep up his fitness. He impressed the Cheetahs when he played for the LionsXII in a friendly against them and was subsequently offered a contract. 

After making over 40 starts in league and cup competitions for the Cheetahs, Delwinder was handed a contract extension for the 2017 S.League season.

Warriors FC 

He signed for the Warriors FC in 2018 and his contract extended for 2019.

Balestier Khalsa 
On 10 November 2021, Delwinder signed for Singapore Premier League side Balestier Khalsa.

International career 
He was handed his first call-up to the national team in 2011. He became one of the youngest player to represent the Lions when he made his debut for the senior team against Philippines when he was just 18. , Delwinder earned 5 international caps for his country.

References

External links
https://web.archive.org/web/20160304202035/http://www.fas.org.sg/news/delwinder-wants-real-international-cap
https://web.archive.org/web/20131019235338/http://www.fas.org.sg/news/fas-names-20-man-squad-thanh-nien-under-21-international-football-tournament-2013
http://www.goal.com/en-sg/news/3880/singapore/2013/10/11/4323673/pavkovic-to-lead-singapore-u21s-at-thanh-nien-newspaper-cup

1992 births
Living people
Singaporean footballers
Singapore international footballers
Association football defenders
Tanjong Pagar United FC players
Geylang International FC players
Singapore Premier League players
Young Lions FC players
Singaporean sportspeople of Indian descent
Singaporean people of Punjabi descent